IrfanView is an image viewer, editor, organiser and converter program for Microsoft Windows. It can also play video and audio files, and has some image creation and painting capabilities. IrfanView is free for non-commercial use; commercial use requires paid registration. It is noted for its small size, speed, ease of use, and ability to handle a wide variety of graphic file formats. It was first released in 1996.

IrfanView is named after its creator, Irfan Škiljan, from Jajce, Bosnia and Herzegovina, living in Vienna. The current version of IrfanView, 4.62 , works under all versions of Windows from Windows XP to Windows 11. Version 4.44 and older versions were compatible with Windows 95/98/ME and can also be run in Linux under Wine and in macOS using WineBottler.

Features
IrfanView is specifically optimized for fast image display and loading times. It supports viewing and saving of numerous file types including image formats such as BMP, GIF, JPEG, JP2 & JPM (JPEG2000), PNG (includes the optimizer OptiPNG; APNG can be read), TIFF, raw photo formats from digital cameras, ECW (Enhanced Compressed Wavelet), EMF (Enhanced Windows Metafile), FSH (EA Sports format), ICO (Windows icon), PCX (Zsoft Paintbrush), PBM (Portable BitMap), PDF (Portable Document Format), PGM (Portable GrayMap), PPM (Portable PixelMap), TGA (Truevision Targa), WebP, FLIF (Free Lossless Image Format) and viewing of media files such as Flash, Ogg Vorbis, MPEG, MP3, MIDI, and text files.

Image editing includes crop, resize, and rotate. Images can be adjusted by modifying their brightness, contrast, tint, and gamma level manually or automatically, and by converting them between file formats. Many of these changes can be applied to multiple images in one operation using batch processing.

A plugin allows IrfanView to support lossless JPG operations: horizontal or vertical flip, rotation by 90° increments, and cropping.

Plugins
IrfanView uses plugins to handle several additional image, video, and sound formats and to add optional functionality such as filter processing or other program features. With its diverse set of format plugins, the program has been recommended for viewing obscure image formats, or corrupted files, which commercial photo editing software cannot read.

Search engine toolbar
Prior to version 4.41 installer versions of IrfanView supported a number of browser toolbars. Version 4.40 optionally installed the Amazon 1Button App (formerly the Amazon Browser bar).

Reception
Irfanview has been positively reviewed as "really good" for easily and rapidly viewing and manipulating images, with its editing and drawing tools. Other writers have focused on its ability to open a wide variety of image formats. In a series of image quality tests conducted in 2004, compared with commercial image compressors and Adobe Photoshop 7, Irfanview 3.91 produced "consistently better images than the Adobe Photoshop JPEG encoder at the same data rate", and its JPEG2000 compression quality "closely followed" the best codec, JasPer." According to IrfanView's official website, since 2003, IrfanView has been downloaded over 1 million times per month. One independent review in 2017 described Irfanview as "the Swiss Army Knife of image viewers".

Author
Irfan Škiljan graduated from the Vienna University of Technology. In a 2006 interview, then 32-year-old Škiljan said that he was able to more or less live off the software, generating income with the sale of licenses for commercial users and of special versions for different customers.

Logo/mascot
According to Škiljan, the IrfanView logo and mascot is a "road cat" (there is a tire track across the smallest and the biggest icon for Windows Explorer, as well as the version for Microsoft Store) but that he "likes cats", and the icon is "a joke" – the IrfanView website pictures him holding a white domestic cat.

See also
 Comparison of image viewers
 Comparison of raster graphics editors

References

External links
 

image viewers
photo software
raster graphics editors
raw image processing software
screenshot software
Windows-only freeware